The Persian expedition of Catherine the Great in 1796, like the Persian expedition of Peter the Great (1722-1723), was one of the Russo-Persian Wars of the 18th century which did not entail any lasting consequences for either belligerent.

The last decades of the 18th century were marked by continual strife between rival claimants to the Peacock Throne. Empress Catherine the Great of Russia took advantage of the disorder to consolidate her control over the weak polities of the Caucasus, which was, for swaths of it, an integral Persian domain. The kingdom of Georgia, a subject of the Persians for many centuries, became a Russian protectorate in 1783, when King  Erekle II signed the Treaty of Georgievsk, whereby the Empress promised to defend him in the case of  Iranian attack. The  shamkhals of Tarki followed this lead and accepted Russian protection three years later.

With the enthronement of Agha Mohammad Khan as Shah of Persia in 1794 the political climate changed. He put an end to the period of dynastic strife and proceeded to re-strengthen the Persian hold on the Caucasus by re-garrisoning the Iranian territories and cities in the area of modern-day Dagestan, Azerbaijan, and Armenia, as well as ravaging and recapturing Georgia and reducing its capital Tbilisi to a pile of ashes in 1795. Belatedly, the Empress Catherine determined to mount a punitive expedition against the Shah. The ultimate goal for the Russian government involved toppling the anti-Russian shah and replacing him with a half-brother of Agha Muhammad Khan, namely  Morteza Qoli Khan, who had defected to Russia, and was therefore pro-Russian.

Although it was widely expected that a 50,000-strong Russian corps would be led by a seasoned general (Gudovich), the Empress followed the advice of her lover,  Prince Platon Zubov, and entrusted the command to Zubov's youthful brother, Count Valerian Zubov. The Russian troops set out from Kizlyar in April 1796 and stormed the key fortress of Derbent on 10 May. The  Russian court poet  Derzhavin glorified this event in a famous ode; he would later comment bitterly on Valerian Zubov's inglorious return from the expedition in another remarkable poem.

By mid-June Zubov's troops had overrun - without any resistance - most of the territory of modern-day Azerbaijan, including three principal cities — Baku, Shemakha and Ganja. By November they were stationed at the confluence of the Araks and  Kura Rivers, poised to attack mainland Iran.

In that month the Empress of Russia died. Her successor, the Emperor Paul, who detested the Zubovs and had other plans for the army, ordered the troops to retreat back to Russia. This reversal aroused the frustration and enmity of the powerful Zubovs and other officers who took part in the campaign: many of them would join the conspiracy which arranged Paul's assassination five years later.

References

Sources 
Gen. V.A. Potto. The Caucasian Wars of Russia from the 16th century onward. Volumes 1-5. SPb, 1885–86, reprinted in 2006. .

Conflicts in 1796
1796 in Europe
18th century in the Russian Empire
1790s in Iran
18th century in Azerbaijan
18th century in Georgia (country)
Russo-Persian Wars
Military history of Georgia (country)
Wars involving Qajar Iran
Catherine the Great
History of Dagestan
History of Derbent
History of the Caucasus under the Russian Empire
Invasions of Iran
Invasions by Russia